Harshin is a town and the capital of the Harshin woreda, in the Somali Region of Ethiopia, near the border with Somaliland.

Notable people 
Eid Daahir Farah - Former president of Somali Region. He was Born in Harshin.

Demographics 
Based on the 2007 Census conducted by the Central Statistical Agency of Ethiopia (CSA), the town had a population of 8,226, with the wider woreda having a total population of 80,244, of whom 43,869 are men and 36,375 women. While 8,226 or 10.25% are urban inhabitants, a further 39,275 or 48.95% are pastoralists. 99.39% of the population said they were Muslim. This woreda is primarily inhabited by the Sa'ad Musa sub-clan of the Habr Awal Isaaq.

The 1994 national census reported a total population for this woreda of 66,488, of whom 35,145 were men and 31,343 were women; 6,409 or 9.64% were urban inhabitants. The largest ethnic group reported in Harshin was the Somali people (99.89%).

References

Populated places in the Somali Region